Bardet–Biedl syndrome 4 is a protein that in humans is encoded by the BBS4 gene.

This gene encodes a protein which contains tetratricopeptide repeats (TPR), similar to O-linked N-acetylglucosamine transferase. Mutations in this gene have been observed in patients with Bardet–Biedl syndrome type 4. The encoded protein may play a role in pigmentary retinopathy, obesity, polydactyly, renal malformation and mental retardation.

Interactions 

BBS4 has been shown to interact with DCTN1.

References

Further reading

External links 
  GeneReviews/NIH/NCBI/UW entry on Bardet-Biedl Syndrome